White privilege is a societal privilege based on skin lightness.

White Privilege may also refer to:

 White Privilege Conference, a yearly conference held in America
 White Privilege: Unpacking the Invisible Knapsack, a 1988 essay by American scholar Peggy McIntosh
 "White Privilege", a song by Macklemore on the 2005 album The Language of My World
 "White Privilege", a song by Sam Fender on the 2019 album Hypersonic Missiles
 "Privilège du blanc", a right of certain people to wear white clothing in the presence of the Pope

See also
 Privilège du blanc, a Roman Catholic custom which allows certain designated royal women to wear a white dress and veil in the presence of the Pope
 "White Privilege II", a 2016 song by Macklemore & Ryan Lewis, featuring Jamila Woods